Macrarene is a genus of small sea snails, marine gastropod mollusks in the family Liotiidae within the superfamily Trochoidea, the top snails, turban snails and their allies.

Description
The white shells have a turbinate shape and a broad umbilicus. They are characterized by axial ribs and spiral cords, that form spines at their intersections. The lip is not thickened at maturity. It differs from the closely related genus Arene through its lack of shell pigments and in the spacing of the axial sculpture.

Species
Species within the genus Macrarene include:
 Macrarene californica (Dall, 1908)
 Macrarene cookeana (Dall, 1918)
 Macrarene coronadoensis Stohler, 1959
 Macrarene diegensis McLean 1964 
 Macrarene digitata McLean, Absalao & Santos Cruz, 1988
 Macrarene farallonensis (A. G. Smith, 1952)
 Macrarene lepidotera McLean, 1970
 Macrarene spectabilospina Shasky, 1970

References

External links
 To ITIS
 To World Register of Marine Species

 
Liotiidae
Gastropod genera